Joaquín Caballero Rosiñol (born 10 May 1971) is a Mexican politician affiliated with the PRI. He served as Deputy of the LXII Legislature of the Mexican Congress representing Veracruz from 29 August 2012 until 9 April 2013. He also served as the municipal president of Coatzacoalcos.

References

1971 births
Living people
Politicians from Veracruz
Institutional Revolutionary Party politicians
21st-century Mexican politicians
Deputies of the LXII Legislature of Mexico
Members of the Chamber of Deputies (Mexico) for Veracruz
Municipal presidents in Veracruz
People from Coatzacoalcos
Universidad Veracruzana alumni